Michael Gottschalk is a German Olympic middle-distance runner. He represented his country in the men's 1500 meters at the 1996 Summer Olympics. His time was a 3:56.46.

References

1972 births
Living people
German male middle-distance runners
Olympic athletes of Germany
Athletes (track and field) at the 1996 Summer Olympics